The 2013–14 Southeast Missouri State Redhawks men's basketball team represented Southeast Missouri State University during the 2013–14 NCAA Division I men's basketball season. The Redhawks, led by fifth year head coach Dickey Nutt, played their home games at the Show Me Center and were members of the West Division of the Ohio Valley Conference. They finished the season 18–14, 8–8 in OVC play to finish in second place in the West Division. They advanced to the quarterfinals of the OVC tournament where they lost to Eastern Kentucky.

Roster

Schedule

|-
!colspan=9 style="background:#FF0000; color:#000000;"| Exhibition

|-
!colspan=9 style="background:#FF0000; color:#000000;"| Regular season

|-
!colspan=9 style="background:#FF0000; color:#000000;"| Ohio Valley Conference tournament

References

Southeast Missouri State Redhawks men's basketball seasons
Southeast Missouri State
Southeast Missouri State Redhawks men's basketball
Southeast Missouri State Redhawks men's basketball